The 1987 Copa Lan Chile was the 17th edition of the Chilean Cup tournament. The competition started on February 28, 1987 and concluded on July 22, 1987. Only first level teams took part in the tournament. Cobresal won the competition for their first time, beating Colo-Colo 2–0 in the final.

Calendar

Group Round

Group North

Group South

Final

Top goalscorer
Iván Zamorano (Cobresal) 13 goals

See also
 1987 Campeonato Nacional

References
Revista Deporte Total, (Santiago, Chile) March–July 1987 (scores & information)
Solofutbol

Copa Chile
Chile
1987